The 1988 Hong Kong District Board elections were the third district board elections held on 10 March 1988. Election was held to all 19 districts of Hong Kong (in which Yau Tsim District and Mong Kok District later merged into today's Yau Tsim Mong District), for 264 members from directly elected constituencies while there were 141 appointed seats and respectively 30 and 27 ex officio members representing the Urban Council and rural committees in New Territories.

Overview
The election oversaw the increasing influence of the political groups in the local elections. The three major emerging pro-democratic groups, which later evolved into today's pro-democracy camp, the Meeting Point, Association for Democracy and People's Livelihood and Hong Kong Affairs Society were the strategic allies against the conservative kaifong leaders in the election. The older political organisation, the Hong Kong Civic Association cooperated with Maria Tam's Progressive Hong Kong Society, while the Progressive Hong Kong Society and the pro-Beijing leftist Hong Kong Federation of Trade Unions remained in low-profile in the election.

Some candidates who used to be closely associated with older conservative groups were switching over to the younger liberal camps, such as Vivien Chan stood for the Reform Club of Hong Kong in 1985 and was claimed to be one of the influential members in the club had moved over to the Hong Kong Affairs Society. Tony Kan Chung-nin had also swung away from Maria Tam's conservative Progressive Hong Kong Society to the liberal Hong Kong Affairs Society.

In this election, the Meeting Point had built a power base in Tuen Mun while the Association for Democracy and People's Livelihood in Sham Shui Po. The Hong Kong Affairs Society had its power base in Sha Tin while it tried to test their strength in the Eastern District, Wan Chai and Central and Western District, and tried to break the dominance of the older conservative Civic Association. The Reform Club tried to recapture a power base in the Eastern District under the umbrella of Brook Bernacchi and concentrated its resources in Yau Ma Tei under Kwan Lim-ho.

The turnout rate of 30.31 per cent was recorded, 7 points lower than the last election in 1985.

General outcome

|-
! style="background-color:#E9E9E9;text-align:center;" colspan=2 |Political Affiliation
! style="background-color:#E9E9E9;text-align:right;" |Popular vote
! style="background-color:#E9E9E9;text-align:right;" |%
! style="background-color:#E9E9E9;text-align:right;" |Standing
! style="background-color:#E9E9E9;text-align:right;" |Elected
|-
| width=1px style="background-color: " |
| style="text-align:left;" |Hong Kong Association for Democracy and People's Livelihood 
| 65,338 || 10.25 || 32 || 27
|-
|style="background-color:"|
| style="text-align:left;" |Hong Kong Affairs Society
| 36,666 || 5.75 || 22 || 17
|-
| width=1px style="background-color: " |
| style="text-align:left;" |Hong Kong Civic Association 
| 42,397 || 6.65 || 31 || 16
|-
| width=1px style="background-color: " |
| style="text-align:left;" |Meeting Point 
| 41,878 || 6.57 || 23 || 16
|-
| width=1px style="background-color: " |
| style="text-align:left;" |Reform Club of Hong Kong
| 9,570 || 1.50 || 7 || 2
|-
| width=1px style="background-color: " |
| style="text-align:left;" |Hong Kong Federation of Trade Unions 
| 3,360 || 0.53 || 2 || 2
|-
|style="background-color:"|
| style="text-align:left;" |Independent and others 
| 438,190	|| 68.75 ||	 376 || 183
|-
|style="text-align:left;background-color:#E9E9E9" colspan="2"|Total (turnout 30.3%)
|width="75" style="text-align:right;background-color:#E9E9E9"|637,399
|width="30" style="text-align:right;background-color:#E9E9E9"|100.0
|style="text-align:right;background-color:#E9E9E9"|493
|style="text-align:right;background-color:#E9E9E9"|264
|}

References

 
Hong Kong
Local elections
1988
Hong Kong local elections
Hong Kong local elections